Lusignan can refer to:

Lusignan dynasty, a European ruling family
Château de Lusignan, the seat of the lords of Lusignan in Lusignan, Vienne, France
Lusignan, Vienne, a town in Vienne, France
Canton of Lusignan, a canton in Vienne, France
Lusignan-Petit, a town in Lot-et-Garonne, France
Lusignan, Guyana, a town in Guyana.
Franz Joseph, Marquis de Lusignan, an Austrian general (1753-1832)